The anterior cardiac veins (or anterior veins of right ventricle) are a variable number of small vessels (usually 2-5) which drain blood from the anterior portion of the right ventricle into the right atrium.

Anatomy 
The right marginal vein frequently opens into the right atrium, and is therefore sometimes regarded as belonging to this group.

Fate 
Unlike most cardiac veins, the anterior cardiac veins not end in the coronary sinus; instead, they drain directly into the anterior wall of the right atrium.

References

External links

Veins of the torso